Linn may refer to:

People
 Linn (surname)
 Linn (given name)
 Carl Linnaeus, abbreviated as Linn.
 Linn da Quebrada, stage name of Brazilian singer, actress, screenwriter and television personality Lina Pereira dos Santos (born 1990)

Places

Germany
 Linn (Gangkofen), a part of Gangkofen in the Rottal-Inn district, Bavaria
 Linn (Massing), a part of Massing in the Rottal-Inn district, Bavaria

Scotland
 Linn (ward), an electoral ward in Glasgow
 Linn Park, Glasgow, a park on the outskirts of Glasgow

United States
 Linn, Kansas, a city
 Linn, Mississippi, an unincorporated community
 Linn, Missouri, a city
 Linn, Texas, an unincorporated area and census-designated place
 Linn, West Virginia
 Linn, Wisconsin, a town
 Linn County, Iowa
 Linn County, Kansas
 Linn County, Missouri
 Linn County, Oregon
 Mount Linn, California
 Linn Creek (Fox River tributary), Missouri
 Linn Lake, a lake in Minnesota
 Linn Park, Birmingham, Alabama, an urban park
 Linn Township (disambiguation)

Elsewhere
 Linn, Aargau, a former municipality in the Canton of Aargau, Switzerland
 Linn Mesa, Victoria Land, Antarctica

Businesses
 Linn Energy, a defunct oil and gas company that operated in Western Oklahoma
 Linn Products, a Scottish audio electronics company
 Linn Records, a record label, a division of Linn Products

Other uses
 Linn (geology), in Scotland and northern England a type of water feature
Waterfall
 Linn tractor, a heavy duty civilian half-track or crawler tractor
 Linn LM-1, the first programmable digital drum machine
 Linn's Stamp News, a weekly newspaper for stamp collectors

See also
 Lin (disambiguation)
 Lyn (disambiguation)
 Lynn (disambiguation)